Mühlhausen is a municipality in the district of Neumarkt in Bavaria in Germany. It lies in the Sulz River valley.

The commune of Mühlhausen includes the following localities:

History
In 1888 Mühlhausen became a railway station on the route Neumarkt in der Oberpfalz - Beilngries. Deutsche Bahn stopped the route step by step from 1987 till 1991.

After World War II, a large number of refugees and expellees from the Sudetenland Egerland, Silesia and other former German settlement areas settled in Mühlhausen and caused a population increase.

References

Neumarkt (district)
Bavarian Circle